Thiorhodospira is a genus of bacteria from the family of Ectothiorhodospiraceae with one known species (Thiorhodospira sibirica).

References

Chromatiales
Bacteria genera
Monotypic bacteria genera
Taxa described in 1999